The four-toed worm lizard (Bipes canaliculatus) is a worm lizard species in the family Amphisbaenidae. It is endemic to Mexico.

References

Bipes (lizard)
Endemic reptiles of Mexico
Balsas dry forests
Taxa named by Pierre André Latreille
Reptiles described in 1801